Local elections were held in Occidental Mindoro on May 9, 2022, as part of the 2022 Philippine general election. Voters will select candidates for all local positions: a town mayor, vice mayor, and town councilors, as well as members of the Sangguniang Panlalawigan, a vice-governor, a governor, and a representative for the province's lone congressional district in the Philippine House of Representatives.

Results 
Incumbent governor Eduardo Gadiano of Pederalismo ng Dugong Dakilang Samahan (PDDS) defeated outgoing representative Josephine Sato of the Liberal Party (LP), winning a new second consecutive term. Meanwhile, Diana Apigo-Tayag (PDDS) defeated Eric Constantino (LP) in the vice-gubernatorial race. In the lone congressional district, Odie Tarriela (PDDS) defeated Philip Ramirez (LP).

Governor

Per Municipality

Vice Governor

Per Municipality

Congressional District

Provincial Board

1st District 

|colspan=5 bgcolor=black|

2nd District 

|colspan=5 bgcolor=black|

Municipal elections

Abra de Ilog

Calintaan

Looc

Lubang

Magsaysay

Mamburao

Paluan

Rizal

Sablayan

San Jose

Santa Cruz

References 

2022 Philippine local elections
May 2022 events in the Philippines